Gil Bernal (1931–2011) was a singer and a session musician. His saxophone can be heard on recordings such as "Searchin'" by The Coasters. In the 1950s he played on Duane Eddy's 1958 album Have 'Twangy' Guitar Will Travel. In later years, he played on Warren Zevon's 2003 album The Wind and the Chávez Ravine album by Ry Cooder.

Background
Bernal was born on February 4, 1931, in Watts, Los Angeles. His father was Sicilian and his mother Mexican.

Career
As well as a musician, Bernal was a singer in his own right. As singer he sang on his own singles, which included "Keep Those Wanderin' Eyes Off My Baby", "Tower of Strength" and "The Dogs".

Early years to the 1950s
By the time he was in his teens he was an accomplished singer and saxophonist. In the early days he played at parties. In 1950, he ended up replacing a sax player that Lionel Hampton had fired. He then toured nationally with Hampton in a band that included Quincy Jones and Little Jimmy Scott. In the period between 1954 and 1955, Bernal recorded under his own name. He recorded "Easyville" and "The Whip" for the Spark Records label. Two others he recorded for the label were "Strawberry Stomp" and "King Solomon's Mines".  "The Whip" did receive some airplay and was used by Alan Freed as the opening theme for his late R&B show. He did some session work for the label which included "Riot in Cell Block Number 9" by The Robins.
He played on Duane Eddy's 1958 hit "Rebel Rouser" and also "Stalkin'".

1960s
His single "This Is Worth Fighting For" was picked by Billboard in July 1967 to chart in the hot 100.<ref>Billboard July 29, 1967 Page 18 Spotlight Singles, CHART Spotlights-Predicted to reach the HOT 100 Chart</ref> Also in 1967, the film Banning that starred Robert Wagner and Jill St. John and Gene Hackman was released. Bernal sang the song "The Eyes of Love" which was featured in the film. He received an Academy Award nomination for it. He performed "It Sure Is Groovy" for the movie "In The Heat of the Night" starring Sidney Poitier and Rod Steiger.LA Weekly Tuesday, July 19, 2011 R.I.P. Gil Bernal; Los Angeles Tenor Sax Great is Dead, Obituary by Jonny Whiteside Bernal also sang "The Next Train Out", featured in the 1969 film Blood of Dracula's Castle.

1970s
In 1970, he was signed to Amaret Records with the intention to be produced Joe Porter and Jerry Styner.

1990s to 2000s
In 1997 he appeared in the film The End of Violence. In the 90s, he received a phone call from Ry Cooder, who had known him for about five years, asking him to come to Havana in the next few days to play on a recording by Ibrahim Ferrer. Bernal didn't have his passport in order and it would have been weeks before he could get it sorted. In the end, the solution was to overdub the saxophone parts. So following Cooder's instructions, he added the parts. In 2005, Bernal contributed to Cooder's concept album Chavez Ravine.

In 2012, his record "The Dogs" bw "James" was re-released by Jukebox Jam Series in 2012. The A side is a Northern Soul favorite while the B side is a tribute to Civil Rights Movement figure James Meredith. Bernal had agreed to the terms of reissuing the 45 but died before the record was released.

Death
In 2011, he died in Glendale, California, at the age of 80.

Discography

References

Links
 
 Gil Bernal Wikipedia Germany

Discussions
 Gil Bernal discussed at Monstor Movie Music
 Gil Bernal discussed at Soul Source

1931 births
2011 deaths
American people of Italian descent
American session musicians
American jazz tenor saxophonists
American male saxophonists
American male pop singers
Singers from Los Angeles
Hispanic and Latino American musicians
American musicians of Mexican descent
American male actors of Mexican descent
Jazz musicians from California
American male jazz musicians
20th-century American saxophonists